Karen Klimczak, S.S.J. (October 27, 1943 – April 14, 2006), a member of the Sisters of St. Joseph of Buffalo, New York, was murdered there on April 14, 2006. She had just returned from Good Friday services.

Life
Klimczak ministered to women prisoners in a local prison, visiting them and helping their families. As a result of her experiences there, she, together with the Rev. Roy Herberger, a Catholic priest, had developed the goal of helping former prisoners in the Bissonette House, a home for parolees on the city's East Side. The home is named after a Catholic priest, Joseph Bissonette, who had lived on site. Joseph was murdered in 1987 by a vagrant whom he was trying to help, as was his practice. In a repetition of history, it was one of the residents of the house who murdered Sister Karen, after she caught him stealing her cell phone. During the incident, the resident had been under the influence of crack cocaine.

Sister Karen Klimczak was well known throughout Buffalo.  She had launched a campaign of leaving large cut-out doves at the scenes of Buffalo homicides.  These doves, stating "I leave Peace Prints" became increasingly popular right after her death. The doves are now posted throughout the Buffalo community as a result of Peaceprints(TM) Prison Ministries, an organization started as a result of Sister Karen's work.

During the 1970s, Klimczak was an elementary and junior high school teacher at St. Stanislaus School in Chicopee, Massachusetts.

Legacy
The SSJ Sister Karen Klimczak Center for Nonviolence was opened in February 2007 to continue the work she had done. It offers opportunities for people to learn and practice nonviolence. Offerings include training in the Alternatives to Violence Project, educational outreach and support for groups working with at-risk inner-city youth. A book was published by the congregation in 2008, Peaceprints: Sister Karen’s Paths to Nonviolence.

Notes

References 
 Angel for Ex-Convicts Is Killed at Halfway House She Ran.  The New York Times, page B1, April 19, 2006.
 Peace Prints, a song 

1943 births
2006 deaths
People from Buffalo, New York
Sisters of Saint Joseph
Schoolteachers from Massachusetts
American murder victims
People murdered in New York (state)
Place of birth missing
20th-century American Roman Catholic nuns
20th-century American educators
Educators from New York (state)
20th-century American women educators
2006 murders in the United States
21st-century American Roman Catholic nuns